Ten Cent Beer Night was a promotion held by Major League Baseball's Cleveland Indians during a game against the Texas Rangers at Cleveland Stadium on Tuesday, June 4, 1974. The promotion was meant to improve attendance at the game by offering cups of low-alcohol beer for just 10 cents each, a substantial discount on the regular price of 65 cents, with a limit of six beers per purchase but with no limit on the number of purchases made during the game.

Six days earlier, the Indians and the Rangers had been involved in a widely-publicized bench-clearing brawl; the game therefore drew a rowdy and belligerent crowd. As the game proceeded, on-field incidents and massive alcohol consumption further agitated the audience, many of whom threw lit firecrackers, streaked across the playing field, and openly smoked marijuana. Most sober fans departed early, leaving an increasingly drunk and unruly mob behind. Continued degradation of the game culminated in a riot in the ninth inning when fans rushed the field. Players were forced to protect themselves with bats while retreating from the field. Chief umpire Nestor Chylak declared the game to be forfeited in Texas' favor due to the mob's uncontrollable behavior.

Background
The Indians had previously held such promotions without incident, beginning with Nickel Beer Day in 1971. 

However, a bench-clearing brawl during the teams' last meeting one week earlier at Arlington Stadium in Texas angered many Indians fans, who then harbored a grudge against the Rangers. The trouble at Arlington began in the bottom of the fourth inning with a walk to the Rangers' Tom Grieve, followed by a Lenny Randle single. The next batter hit what should have been a double-play ball to Indians third baseman John Lowenstein; Lowenstein stepped on third base to retire Grieve and threw the ball to second base for the second out, but Randle disrupted the play with a hard slide into second baseman Jack Brohamer.

The Indians retaliated in the bottom of the eighth when pitcher Milt Wilcox threw behind Randle's legs. Randle eventually laid down a bunt. When Wilcox fielded the ball and tagged Randle out, Randle hit him with his forearm. Indians first baseman John Ellis responded by punching Randle, and both benches emptied for a brawl. After the brawl was broken up, as Indians players and coaches returned to the dugout, they were struck by food and beer hurled by Rangers fans; catcher Dave Duncan had to be restrained from entering the stands to fight the fans.

The game was not suspended or forfeited, no players from either team were ejected, and the Rangers won 3–0.

After the game, a Cleveland reporter asked Rangers manager Billy Martin, "Are you going to take your armor to Cleveland?" to which Martin replied, "Naw, they won't have enough fans there to worry about." During the week leading up to the teams' next meeting in Cleveland, sports radio talk show host Pete Franklin and Indians radio announcer Joe Tait made comments that fueled the fans' animosity toward the Rangers. In addition, The Plain Dealer printed a cartoon the day of the game showing Chief Wahoo holding a pair of boxing gloves with the caption, "Be ready for anything."

The game

Problems from the beginning
Six days after the brawl in Texas, Cleveland's Ten Cent Beer Night promotion drew 25,134 fans to Cleveland Stadium for the Tuesday night game, twice the number expected. 12 fluid ounce (355 ml) cups of beer were offered for just 10 cents each, a substantial discount on the regular price of 65 cents, with a limit of six beers per purchase but with no limit on the number of purchases made during the game.

The Rangers quickly took a 5–1 lead. Meanwhile, throughout the game, the increasingly inebriated crowd grew more and more unruly. Early in the game, Cleveland's Leron Lee hit a line drive into the stomach of Rangers pitcher Ferguson Jenkins, after which Jenkins dropped to the ground. Fans in the upper deck of the stadium cheered, then chanted, "Hit 'em again! Hit 'em again! Harder! Harder!" A woman ran out to the Indians' on-deck circle, flashed her breasts, and then unsuccessfully tried to kiss umpire Nestor Chylak. As Grieve hit his second home run of the game, a naked man sprinted onto the field and slid in to second base. One inning later, a father-and-son pair ran onto the outfield and mooned the fans in the bleachers.

Some fans brought firecrackers to the game, which they set off in the stands or threw onto the field. As the game progressed, more fans ran onto the field and disrupted play. Rangers first baseman Mike Hargrove was pelted with hot dogs and spat at, and at one point was nearly struck by an empty gallon jug of Thunderbird.

The Rangers later argued a call in which Lee was called safe in a close play at third base, spiking Jenkins with his cleats in the process and forcing him to leave the game. The Rangers' angry response to this call provoked an enraged outburst from Cleveland fans, who again began throwing objects onto the field. A fan also threw lit firecrackers into the Rangers' bullpen. The clouds of firecracker and marijuana smoke further contributed to the unsettling mood.

By the seventh inning, those fans who remained sober had mostly left the ballpark— the remaining crowd became increasingly intoxicated and belligerent, as sportswriter Paul Jackson described in a 2008 article on the event:

In the bottom of the ninth, the Indians managed to rally, tying the game 5–5, and had Rusty Torres on second base representing the potential winning run. However, with a rowdy crowd that had been drinking heavily for nine innings, the situation finally boiled over.

The riot
After the Indians managed to tie the game, a 19-year-old fan named Terry Yerkic ran onto the field and attempted to steal Texas outfielder Jeff Burroughs' cap. Burroughs stumbled while confronting Yerkic. Thinking that Burroughs had been attacked, Texas manager Billy Martin and his players ran onto the field; some with bats. A large number of intoxicated fans—some armed with knives, chains, and clubs fashioned from portions of stadium seats that they had torn apart—surged onto the field, and others hurled bottles from the stands. Two hundred fans surrounded the 25 Rangers, with more fans coming.

Realizing that the Rangers' lives might be in danger, Cleveland manager Ken Aspromonte ordered his players to grab bats and help the Rangers, attacking the team's own fans in the process. Rioters began throwing steel folding chairs, and Cleveland relief pitcher Tom Hilgendorf was hit in the head by one of them. Hargrove, after subduing one rioter in a fistfight, had to fight another on his way back to the Texas dugout. The two teams retreated off the field through the dugouts in groups, with players protecting each other.

The teams fled into their clubhouses and closed and locked the doors. The crowd pulled up and stole the bases from the infield. Rioters threw a vast array of objects including cups, rocks, bottles, batteries from radios, hot dogs, popcorn containers, and folding chairs. Umpire crew chief Chylak, realizing that order would not be restored in a timely fashion, forfeited the game to Texas. He too was a victim of the rioters, as one struck and cut his head with part of a stadium seat and his hand was cut by a thrown rock.  He later called the fans "uncontrollable beasts" and stated that he'd never seen anything like what had happened "except in a zoo".

The rioting continued for 20 minutes. As Joe Tait and Herb Score called the riot live on radio, Score noted the security guards' inability to handle the crowd. Tait said, "Aw, this is absolute tragedy." The Cleveland Division of Police finally arrived to restore order, arresting nine fans. Indians players escorted the Rangers to the team bus. A local sportswriter, Dan Coughlin of the Chronicle-Telegram, attempted to interview fans but was punched in the face twice.

Cleveland general manager Phil Seghi blamed the umpires for losing control of the game. The Sporting News wrote that "Seghi's perspective might have been different had he been in Chylak's shoes, in the midst of knife-wielding, bottle-throwing, chair-tossing, fist-swinging drunks". American League president Lee MacPhail commented, "There was no question that beer played a part in the riot."

The next Beer Night promotion on July 18 attracted 41,848 fans with beer again selling for 10 cents per cup but with a limit of two cups per person at the reduced price.

Box score

Notable attendees
Among the Indians players fleeing was outfielder Rusty Torres.  In his career, Torres wound up seeing three big-league baseball riots close up (all of which resulted in forfeits); in addition to this game, he had been with the New York Yankees at the Senators' final game in Washington in 1971, and he would be with the Chicago White Sox during the infamous Disco Demolition Night in 1979.

NBC newscaster Tim Russert, then a student at the Cleveland–Marshall College of Law, attended the game. "I went with $2 in my pocket," recalled the Meet the Press host. "You do the math."

See also

 Bottlegate, a 2001 Cleveland Browns game ended early due to unruly fan behavior
 Bounty Bowl
 Disco Demolition Night
 Forfeit (baseball) for a list of similar events
 Hooliganism

References

External links
 Box score and play-by-play at Retrosheet

1974 in sports in Ohio
1974 Major League Baseball season
1970s in Cleveland
20th century in Arlington, Texas
Alcohol abuse in the United States
Cleveland Indians
Drinking culture
Hooliganism
June 1974 sports events in the United States
Major League Baseball controversies
Major League Baseball games
Riots and civil disorder in Cleveland
Sports riots
Texas Rangers (baseball)